Chato District is one of the five districts in Geita Region of northwestern Tanzania. Its administrative centre is the town of Chato. The main ethnic group in the district are the Sukuma. The late John Magufuli, who used to be as President of Tanzania from 2015—2021, was born in Chato.

History

The Chato District was formed around 2005 within Kagera Region after being separated from Biharamulo District. In 2012, it was transferred to the newly created Geita Region.

In March 2006, Rwandan refugees who had settled in the district were evicted. The following year, a few who had been evicted improperly were allowed to come back.

Transport

Airport

Road
The paved truck road T4 (from Mwanza to Bukoba) passes through southern part of the Chao district.

Geography

Location
Chato District neighbours Lake Victoria to the northeast, Geita District to the east, the districts of Mbogwe and Bukombe to the south, and  Biharamulo District of the Kagera Region to the west and north.

Topology

Climate

Administration Division

Wards

The Chato District is divided into 23 wards:

 Bukome
 Buseresere
 Butengorumasa
 Buziku
 Bwanga
 Bwera
 Bwina
 Bwongera
 Chato
 Minkoto
 Ichwankima
 Ilemela

 Ilyamchele
 Iparamasa
 Kachwamba
 Kasenga
 Katende
 Kigongo
 Makurugusi
 Muganza
 Muungano
 Nyamirembe
 Nyarutembo

Economy

The primary economic activity is subsistence farming without irrigation, using only rain.

Food Crops
Common crops for local consumption are bananas, beans, maize, cassavas, and sweet potatoes.

Cash Crops
Commercial farming is not well developed, but cotton, sunflower, tobacco and coffee are grown for sale.

Livestock
Livestock rearing is usually an adjunct to farming, with some commercial ranches.

Tourism
Rubondo Island National Park is located on an island in Lake Victoria just off the coast of Chato District. It can be reached by ferry from Kasenda, a village in the north of the district.

References

Districts of Geita Region